Mikhail Alekseyevich Chesnokov (born 11 February 1961) is a Russian retired professional footballer.

Club career
He made his professional debut in the Soviet Second League in 1977 for FC Baltika Kaliningrad. He played 2 games and scored 1 goal in the European Cup Winners' Cup 1984–85 for FC Dynamo Moscow.

Honours
 Soviet Cup winner: 1984.

References

1961 births
Sportspeople from Kaliningrad
Living people
Soviet footballers
Russian footballers
FC Baltika Kaliningrad players
FC Torpedo Moscow players
FC Lokomotiv Moscow players
FC Dynamo Moscow players
Soviet Top League players
FC Fakel Voronezh players
FC Shinnik Yaroslavl players
Association football forwards
FC Dynamo Vologda players